Zakopane (Podhale Goral: Zokopane) is a town in the extreme south of Poland, in the southern part of the Podhale region at the foot of the Tatra Mountains. From 1975 to 1998, it was part of Nowy Sącz Voivodeship; since 1999, it has been part of Lesser Poland Voivodeship.  its population was 27,266. Zakopane is a centre of Goral culture and is often referred to as "the winter capital of Poland". It is a popular destination for mountaineering, skiing, and tourism.

Zakopane lies near Poland's border with Slovakia, in a valley between the Tatra Mountains and Gubałówka Hill. It can be reached by train or bus from the provincial capital, Kraków, about two hours away. Zakopane lies 800–1,000 metres above sea level and centres on the intersection of its Krupówki and Kościuszko Streets.

History 

The earliest documents mentioning Zakopane date to the 17th century, describing a glade called Zakopisko. In 1676, it was a village of 43 inhabitants. In 1818, Zakopane was a small town that was still being developed. There were only 340 homes that held 445 families. The population of Zakopane at that time was 1,805: 934 women and 871 men. The first church was built in 1847, by Józef Stolarczyk.

Zakopane became a center for the region's mining and metallurgy industries; by the 19th century, it was the largest center for metallurgy in the region of Galicia. It expanded during the 19th century as the climate attracted more inhabitants. By 1889, it had developed from a small village into a climatic health resort. Rail services to Zakopane began on October 1, 1899. In the late 1800s, Zakopane constructed a road that went to the town of Nowy Targ and had railways that came from Chabówka. Because of easier transportation, the population of Zakopane had increased to about 3,000 people by the end of the 1800s. In the 19th century, Krupówki Street was just a narrow beaten path that was meant for people to get from the central part of town to the village of Kuźnice.

The ski jump on Wielka Krokiew was opened in 1925.
The cable car to Kasprowy Wierch was completed in 1936.
The funicular connected Zakopane and the top of Gubałówka in 1938.

Because of Zakopane's popular ski mountains, the town gained popularity which made the number of tourists increase to about 60,000 people by 1930.

During the joint German-Soviet invasion of Poland, which started World War II in September 1939, the town was invaded by Germany, and the Einsatzgruppe I entered the town on September 4, 1939, to commit various crimes against Poles. In March 1940, representatives of the Soviet NKVD and the Nazi Gestapo met for one week in Zakopane's Villa Tadeusz, to coordinate the pacification of resistance in Poland. Throughout World War II, Zakopane served as an underground staging point between Poland and Hungary.

From 1942 to 1943, 1,000 prisoners from the German Kraków-Płaszów concentration camp were set to work in a stone quarry. In 1944, during the Warsaw Uprising, the Germans deported thousands of Varsovians from the Dulag 121 camp in Pruszków, where they were initially imprisoned, to Zakopane. Those Poles were mainly old people, ill people and women with children. In mid-October 1944, there were 3,800 registered Poles, who were expelled from Warsaw, and probably another 3,800 unregistered expellees. In January 1945, the Germans retreated from Zakopane and the German occupation ended.

Climate
Zakopane has a humid continental climate (Köppen climate classification: Dfb), with the main factor behind its relative coldness compared to the rest of Poland is its altitude. In general, the temperature tends to fall with altitude, therefore Zakopane is almost  colder than northern Kraków, which is more than  lower than Zakopane. With higher altitudes, the climate gets even colder, therefore, on the top of Kasprowy Wierch ( above sea level), the climate is tundra-like (Köppen: ET).

Winters are typically frosty but are relatively sunny for Poland - in fact, Zakopane receives among the most sun in winter in the country. Snow is normally abundant, particularly in the higher altitudes, which makes Zakopane among the most popular ski resorts in Poland. Summers are cool to warm but rarely get hot.

The defining feature of the local climate is the location on the northern slope of the Tatra mountains. Zakopane receives significantly more precipitation than cities on the lowlands to the north of the Carpathians, and just like in the mountains in general, there might be sudden weather changes from sunny to rainy, and vice versa. Occasionally, a very warm foehn wind locally known as halny may dramatically increase the temperatures, sometimes beyond  in winter.

Architecture

The Zakopane Style of Architecture is an architectural mode inspired by the regional art of Poland's highland region known as Podhale. Drawing on the motifs and traditions in the buildings of the Carpathian Mountains, the style was pioneered by Stanislaw Witkiewicz and is now considered a core tradition of the Goral people.

Sports 
The Tatras are a popular destination among hikers, skiers, ski-tourers and climbers.

Mountaineering

There is a network of well-marked hiking trails in the Tatras and according to the national park regulations the hikers must stick to them. Most of these trails are overcrowded, especially in the summer season.

The High Tatras offer excellent opportunities for climbing (up to X UIAA grade).

In summer, lightning and snow are both potential hazards for climbers, and the weather can change quickly. Thunderstorms are common in the afternoons. In winter the snow can be up to several meters deep.

Skiing
In the winter, thousands arrive in Zakopane to ski, especially around Christmas and in February. The most popular skiing areas are Kasprowy Wierch and Gubałówka. There are a number of cross country skiing trails in the forests surrounding the town.

Zakopane hosted the Nordic World Ski Championships in 1929, 1939, and 1962; the winter Universiades in 1956, 1993, and 2001; the biathlon World Championship; several ski jumping world cups; and several Nordic combined, Nordic and Alpine European Cups. It hosted the Alpine World Ski Championships in 1939, the first outside the Alps and the last official world championships prior to World War II.

Zakopane made unsuccessful bids to host the 2006 Winter Olympics and the 2011 and 2013 Alpine World Ski Championships.

Tourism 

Zakopane is visited by over 2,500,000 tourists a year. In the winter, Zakopane's tourists are interested in winter sports activities such as skiing, snowboarding, ski jumping, snowmobiling, sleigh rides, snowshoe walks, and Ice skating. During the summer, Tourists come to do activities like hiking, climbing, bike and horse ride the Tatras mountain, there are many trails in the Tatras. Tourists ride quads and dirt bikes that you can rent. Swimming and boat rides on the Dunajec river are popular. Many come to experience Goral culture, which is rich in its unique styles of food, speech, architecture, music, and costume. Zakopane is especially popular during the winter holidays, which are celebrated in traditional style, with dances, decorated horse-pulled sleighs called kuligs and roast lamb.

Popular tourist activity is taking a stroll through the town's most popular street: Krupówki. It is lined with stores, restaurants, carnival rides, and performers.

During the winter and summer seasons, Krupówki Street is crowded with tourists visiting the shops and restaurants. In the summer, a local market along Krupówki Street offers traditional Goral apparel, leather jackets, fur coats, shoes, and purses. Venders also sell foods like the famous oscypek smoked sheep cheese, fruit, vegetables, and meats. There are also many stands with Zakopane souvenirs.

Zakopane is popular for its nightlife. At night there are always people walking around town checking out the different bars and dance clubs. Most of these bars and dance clubs are located on Krupowki street. These are the bars that are located in Zakopane: Paparazzi, Cafe Piano, Anemone, Anemone, Cafe Antrakt, Literatka, Winoteka Pod Berlami, and Karczma u Ratownikow. These are dance clubs located in Zakopane: Vavaboom, Finlandia Arctic, Genesis, Rockus, Morskie Oko, and Cocomo Go-Go Club.

A scene in Andrzej Wajda's film Man of Marble (Człowiek z marmuru) was filmed in Zakopane, introducing the town to a worldwide audience.

The mountain scenes from the Bollywood film Fanaa were filmed around Zakopane.

International relations

Zakopane participates in town twinning to foster international links.
 Bansko, Bulgaria
 San Carlos de Bariloche (Argentina)
 Bavel (Netherlands)
 Polonezköy, Turkey
 Poprad, Slovakia
 Saint-Dié-des-Vosges (France)
 Sopot, Poland
 Stryi, Ukraine
 Vysoké Tatry, Slovakia
 Siegen, Germany

Notable structures 
COS Zakopane speed-skating rink
Gubałówka Hill Funicular
Kasprowy Wierch cable car
Wielka Krokiew ski jumping ramp

Notable residents 

 Tytus Chałubiński (1820 – 1889 in Zakopane), Polish physician and co-founder of the Polish Tatra Society
 Klemens Bachleda (1851-1910), Polish mountain guide and mountain rescuer, worked from Zakopane
 Stanisław Witkiewicz, (1851 – 1915) Polish painter, architect, writer and art theoretician
 Jan Kasprowicz, (1860 – 1926) poet, playwright, critic and translator; a foremost representative of Young Poland
 Mariusz Zaruski, (1867–1941) Polish Brigadier-General, a pioneer of Polish sports yachting, a climber of the Tatra Mountains, a photographer, painter, poet, a seaman, a conspirator, a social activist and teacher
 Jerzy Żuławski, (1874 – 1915) Polish literary figure, philosopher, translator, alpinist and nationalist
 Władysław Orkan, (1875 – 1930) Polish writer from the Young Poland period
 Mieczysław Karłowicz, (1876 – 1909) Polish composer, conductor, mountaineer and photographer of the Tatra Mountains
 Karol Szymanowski, (1882 – 1937) Polish composer and pianist, member of the modernist movement Young Poland; his house in Zakopane, the Villa Atma, is now a museum 
 Kornel Makuszyński, (1884 – 1953) Polish writer of children's and youth literature, elected member of the Polish Academy of Literature in interwar Poland
 Stanisław Ignacy Witkiewicz (1885 – 1939), Witkacy, a painter, philosopher, playwright, novelist and photographer
 Olga Drahonowska-Małkowska, (1888 – 1979 in Zakopane), with her husband, founded scouting in Poland
 Count Edward Bernard Raczyński (1891 – 1993) Polish diplomat, writer, politician and President of Poland in exile
 Anna Zofia Krygowska (1904–1988) Polish mathematician, known for her work in mathematics education
 Wawrzyniec Żuławski (1916 in Zakopane – 1957) Wawa Polish alpinist, educator, composer, music critic, and musicologist
 Władysław Hasior, (1928 – 1999) Polish contemporary sculptor from Podhale region, a painter and theatre set designer
 Teresa Bogucka (born 1945 in Zakopane), journalist, writer, a democratic opposition activist in Communist Poland
 Andrzej Gąsienica-Makowski (born 1952 in Zakopane) politician, led the Nonpartisan Bloc for Support of Reforms
 Janusz Waluś (born 1953 in Zakopane) assassinated Chris Hani, General Secretary of the South African Communist Party
 Liz Glazowski, (born 1957 in Zakopane) Polish-American model, Playboy magazine's Playmate of the Month in April 1980
 Sergiusz Pinkwart, (born 1973) Polish journalist, writer, classical musician and traveler, Magellan Award winner
 Małgorzata Babiarz, (born 1984 in Zakopane) professionally known as Megitza is a singer, double bass player and composer

Sport 
 Stanisław Marusarz (1913 in Zakopane – 1993 in Zakopane) Polish Nordic skiing competitor in the 1930s
 Jan Wojciech Bachleda-Curuś (1951 in Zakopane – 2009) Polish alpine skier who competed in the 1976 Winter Olympics
 Wojciech Fortuna (born 1952 in Zakopane), ski jumper, Olympic gold medallist
 Kamil Stoch, (born 1987 in Zakopane) Polish ski jumper, world champion and three-time Olympic gold medalist
 Oskar Kwiatkowski, (born 1996 in Zakopane), Polish snowboarder

Notable visitors 
 Henryk Sienkiewicz (1846–1916) 
 Bolesław Prus (1847 – 1912)
 Joseph Conrad (1857 – 1924)
 Stefan Żeromski (1864 – 1925)
 Bronisława Dłuska, (1865 – 1939) Polish physician, older sister of physicist Marie Curie
 Marie Curie (1867 – 1934)
 Józef Piłsudski (1867 – 1935)
Alfred Döblin (1878 – 1957)
 Aniela Zagórska (1881 – 1943) niece of Joseph Conrad
 Rudolf Weigl (1883 – 1957)
 Edward Rydz-Śmigły (1886 – 1941), Marshal of Poland, who painted some Zakopane sights
 Artur Rubinstein (1887 – 1982)
 Krystyna Skarbek (1908 – 1952)
 Charles III (born 1948)

Gallery

See also

Notes

Bibliography
Stanisław Kasztelowicz and Stanisław Eile, Stefan Żeromski: kalendarz życia i twórczości (Stefan Żeromski: A Calendar of His Life and Work), Kraków, Wydawnictwo Literackie, 1961.
Zdzisław Najder, Joseph Conrad: A Life, translated by Halina Najder, Rochester, New York, Camden House, 2007, .
Krystyna Tokarzówna and Stanisław Fita, Bolesław Prus, 1847–1912: Kalendarz życia i twórczości (Bolesław Prus, 1847–1912: A Calendar of His Life and Work), edited by Zygmunt Szweykowski, Warsaw, Państwowy Instytut Wydawniczy, 1969.

External links 

 Official website
 Zakopane
 Jewish Community in Zakopane on Virtual Shtetl
 General information
 An English guide to Zakopane
 Twin towns

 
Cities and towns in Lesser Poland Voivodeship
Tatra County
Kraków Voivodeship (14th century – 1795)
Kingdom of Galicia and Lodomeria
Kraków Voivodeship (1919–1939)
Ski areas and resorts in Poland
Spa towns in Poland
Resorts in Poland